Henry Harrison may refer to:

Henry Harrison (Philadelphia mayor) (1713–1766), American mayor of Philadelphia, Pennsylvania
Henry Harrison (c. 1736–1772), brother of Benjamin Harrison V, officer during the French and Indian War
Henry Harrison (Cranford mayor), American mayor of Cranford, New Jersey
Henry Baldwin Harrison (1821–1901), Connecticut Governor
Henry Thomas Harrison (1832–1923), spy during the American Civil War
H. C. A. Harrison (Henry Colden Antill Harrison, 1836–1929), Australian rules football pioneer
Henry Harrison (Irish politician) (1867–1954), Irish Protestant Nationalist politician and writer, M.P. for Mid-Tipperary, 1890–1892 
Henry Sydnor Harrison (1880–1930), American novelist
Henry Harrison, member of rock band Mystery Jets
Henry Shafto Harrison (1810–1892), New Zealand politician
Henry G. Harrison (1813–1895), English architect
Henry Harrison (New York politician) (1854–1935), American businessman and politician
Henry Harrison (cricketer) (1883–1971), English cricketer

See also
Henry Broadley Harrison-Broadley (1853–1914), British politician
Harry Harrison (disambiguation)
William Henry Harrison (disambiguation)